Stenden may refer to:
Stende, Latvia
Stenden, North Rhine-Westphalia, part of Kerken, Germany
Stenden University also known as Stenden Hogeschool, a private educational facility in Leeuwarden, the Netherlands